Zamia muricata is a species of plant in the family Zamiaceae. It is found in Colombia and Venezuela. It is threatened by habitat loss.

References

muricata
Near threatened plants
Taxonomy articles created by Polbot